Pascanas is a small town in the Argentine province of Córdoba.

External links

Populated places in Córdoba Province, Argentina